Benjamin Goller (born 1 January 1999) is a German professional footballer who plays as a right winger for 2. Bundesliga side 1. FC Nürnberg. He has represented Germany internationally at youth levels U18 through U20.

Club career

Youth career and Schalke 04
Goller began his youth career with TSV Holzelfingen, before moving to the youth team of VfL Pfullingen in 2011, and later Stuttgarter Kickers in 2014. In 2016, he joined the youth sector of Schalke 04.

For the 2018–19 season, Goller was promoted to Schalke's reserve team, playing in the Oberliga Westfalen. He made his debut for the reserve team on 1 September 2018, starting against 1. FC Gievenbeck before being substituted off in the 64th minute for Jānis Grīnbergs. The match finished as a 2–0 home loss.

On 11 December 2018, Goller made his first team debut for Schalke in the UEFA Champions League, starting against Lokomotiv Moscow before being substituted out in the 59th minute for Amine Harit. The match finished as a 1–0 home win.

Werder Bremen and loans
In July 2020, Goller joined 2. Bundesliga club Karlsruher SC on loan from Werder Bremen.

In June 2021 it was announced that he would move to Darmstadt 98 on loan for the 2021–22 season.

Goller's loan to Darmstadt 98 was cut short on 31 January 2022, the last day of the 2022 winter transfer window, and he returned to former club Karlsruher SC for a further loan.

1. FC Nürnberg
In December 2022 it was announced Goller would join 2. Bundesliga side 1. FC Nürnberg in January 2023. He signed a long-term contract.

International career
Goller began his youth international career with the Germany under-18 team, making his debut on 13 November 2016 in the international friendly against the Republic of Ireland. He started the match, which finished as a 3–2 win, before being substituted out in the 65th minute for Gabriel Kyeremateng. On 5 September 2017, he scored for the under-19 team in the third minute of a friendly match against England, putting Germany up 2–0. The match finished as a 3–1 win.

Career statistics

Club

References

External links
 
 
 
 

1999 births
Living people
People from Reutlingen
Sportspeople from Tübingen (region)
German footballers
Footballers from Baden-Württemberg
Association football midfielders
Germany youth international footballers
Bundesliga players
2. Bundesliga players
Regionalliga players
FC Schalke 04 II players
FC Schalke 04 players
SV Werder Bremen players
SV Werder Bremen II players
Karlsruher SC players
SV Darmstadt 98 players
1. FC Nürnberg players